This list of historical markers installed by the National Historical Commission of the Philippines (NHCP) in the Cordillera Administrative Region (CAR) is an annotated list of people, places, or events in the region that have been commemorated by cast-iron plaques issued by the said commission. The plaques themselves are permanent signs installed in publicly visible locations on buildings, monuments, or in special locations.

While many Cultural Properties have historical markers installed, not all places marked with historical markers are designated into one of the particular categories of Cultural Properties.

The first historical marker in the Ilocano language was unveiled in 2009 for the Mansion House, Baguio.

For former NHCP Chairperson Maria Serena Diokno, the presence of the historical marker affirmed the historical significance of the City Hall site in Baguio against alterations on the said site under the National Cultural Heritage Act. The historicity was affirmed despite the lack of resolutions or consultations regarding the historical significance of the site.

This article lists twenty-nine (29) markers from the Cordillera Administrative Region.

Abra
This article lists three (3) markers from the Province of Abra.

Apayao 
This article lists no markers from the Province of Apayao.

Benguet
This article lists eighteen (18) markers from the Province of Benguet.

Ifugao
This article lists five (5) markers from the Province of Ifugao.

Kalinga
This article lists one (1) markers from the Province of Kalinga.

Mountain Province
This article lists two (2) markers from the Mountain Province.

See also
 List of Cultural Properties of the Philippines in the Cordillera Administrative Region

References

Footnotes

Bibliography 
 
 
 A list of sites and structures with historical markers, as of 16 January 2012
 A list of institutions with historical markers, as of 16 January 2012

External links
 A list of sites and structures with historical markers, as of 16 January 2012
 A list of institutions with historical markers, as of 16 January 2012
 National Registry of Historic Sites and Structures in the Philippines
 Policies on the Installation of Historical Markers

Cordillera
Cordillera Administrative Region